Hollinhurst is a surname. Notable people with the surname include:

 Alan Hollinghurst (born 1954), British author
 Anne Hollinghurst (born 1964), British Anglican bishop
 Leslie Norman Hollinghurst (1895–1971), British World War I flying ace